= Academic grading in Kyrgyzstan =

Kyrgyzstan employs a five-point grading system:

Grade	Grade description	Notes
5	Эң жакшы (Excellent)	Highest possible grade
4	Жакшы (Very Good)	A passing grade
3	Канаатандырарлык (Satisfactory)	Lowest passing grade
2	Канаатандырарлык эмес (Unsatisfactory)	Not a passing grade
1	Эң kанаатандырарлык эмес (Most Unsatisfactory)	Not a passing grade; uncommon

Teachers and professors enter grades into an official book carried by each student, which is usually called by its Russian name of zachòtka. Students then display these books to potential employers and universities.
